Mohammed Yasir (born 14 April 1998) is an Indian professional footballer who plays as a winger for Indian Super League club Hyderabad and the India national team.

Club career
Born in Manipur, Yasir began his career representing his home state in the National School Games in 2014. In 2015, Yasir joined the Pune academy and then the Pune City academy in 2016. While with Pune City, he captained the under-19 side which won the IFA Shield in June 2017.

Goa
On 23 July 2017, Yasir was selected in the 14th round of the 2017–18 ISL Players Draft by Goa for the 2017–18 Indian Super League season. Yasir made his professional debut for the club on 16 April 2018 in their Super Cup semi-final match against East Bengal. He came on as an 82nd-minute substitute as Goa lost 1–0.

Pune City
On 7 December 2018, Yasir returned to Pune City and made his debut in Indian Super League as he started the last match for Pune City against Mumbai City.

Hyderabad
Yasir made his debut for Hyderabad against Jamshedpur in a 3–1 loss. He won the emerging player award in the home game against Northeast United.

International career
On 25 March 2021, Yasir made his international debut for India against Oman in a friendly match, which ended as 1–1.

Career statistics

Club

International

Honours

International 

 India
 SAFF Championship: 2021

Club 

 Hyderabad FC
 Indian Super League : 2021-22

References

External links 
 Indian Super League Profile

1998 births
Living people
People from Imphal
Indian footballers
FC Goa players
FC Pune City players
Indian Super League players
Association football midfielders
Footballers from Manipur
India international footballers
Hyderabad FC players